Azadegan (also Romanized as Āzādegān) is a village in Zayandeh Rud-e Jonubi Rural District of Sheyda District, Ben County, Chaharmahal and Bakhtiari province, Iran. At the 2006 census, its population was 743 in 172 households, when it was in the former Ben District of Shahrekord County, and before the district's elevation to county status. The following census in 2011 counted 709 people in 207 households. The latest census in 2016 showed a population of 789 people in 240 households, by which time it was in Sheyda District of the recently formed Ben County; it was the largest village in its rural district. The village is populated by Turkic people.

References 

Ben County

Populated places in Chaharmahal and Bakhtiari Province

Populated places in Ben County